Blumenhof is an unincorporated community within the Rural Municipality of Lac Pelletier No. 107, Saskatchewan, Canada.

See also 
 List of communities in Saskatchewan

Lac Pelletier No. 107, Saskatchewan
Unincorporated communities in Saskatchewan
Division No. 4, Saskatchewan